The 2014 Dothan Pro Tennis Classic was a professional tennis tournament played on outdoor clay courts. It was the fourteenth edition of the tournament and part of the 2014 ITF Women's Circuit, offering a total of $50,000 in prize money. It took place in Dothan, Alabama, United States, on April 14–20, 2014.

Singles main draw entrants

Seeds 

 1 Rankings as of April 7, 2014

Other entrants 
The following players received wildcards into the singles main draw:
  Louisa Chirico
  Olga Govortsova
  Melanie Oudin
  Taylor Townsend

The following players received entry from the qualifying draw:
  Ulrikke Eikeri
  Anhelina Kalinina
  Danielle Lao
  Peggy Porter

Champions

Singles 

  Grace Min def.  Victoria Duval 6–3, 6–1

Doubles 

  Anett Kontaveit /  Ilona Kremen def.  Shelby Rogers /  Olivia Rogowska 6–1, 5–7, [10–5]

External links 
 2014 Dothan Pro Tennis Classic at ITFtennis.com
 Official website

2014 ITF Women's Circuit
2014
2014 in American tennis
Dothan Pro Tennis Classic